Sir Henry Neville Dering, 9th Baronet,  (21 September 1839 – 25 August 1906) was a British diplomat.

Dering was the son of Sir Edward Dering, 8th Baronet, a Liberal Party politician. He succeeded his father as baronet in 1896.

He was Envoy Extraordinary and Minister Plenipotentiary to the United States of Mexico 1894–1900, and Envoy Extraordinary and Minister Plenipotentiary to the United States of Brazil 1900–1906. On 21 September 1900, he was appointed a deputy lieutenant of Kent.

He married, in 1853, Rosa Underwood, daughter of Jos. Underwood. They were parents of the next Baronet, Henry Edward Dering. His second son, Sir Herbert Guy Dering, was British Minister to Siam, Bulgaria, and Romania.

References

Baronets in the Baronetage of England
Companions of the Order of the Bath
Deputy Lieutenants of Kent
Knights Commander of the Order of St Michael and St George
Ambassadors of the United Kingdom to Brazil
Ambassadors of the United Kingdom to Mexico
1839 births
1906 deaths